Coupés bien net et bien carré  is the second album from the French actress-turned-singer Sandrine Kiberlain.  It was released on 1 October 2007 by EMI.

Track listing

External links
Official site

2007 albums